Frank Möller may refer to:

 Frank Möller (judoka) (born 1970), German judoka
 Frank Möller (athlete) (born 1960), German athlete
 Frank Möller (footballer) (born 1967), German footballer